The University of Birmingham Hockey Club is a field hockey club based at the University of Birmingham.

The club plays its home games on the Bournbrook pitches on the south side of the University off the Edgbaston Park Road and runs five men's teams and five women's teams. The men's first XI play in the Men's England Hockey League and the women's first XI play in the Women's England Hockey League.

Players

Honours
Investec Women's Cup
 2011–12

Notable players

Men's internationals

James Fair 
Simon Mantell

Women's internationals

 Amy Costello

 Rebecca Condie

References

 
English field hockey clubs
Birmingham
Hockey Club
Sport in Birmingham, West Midlands